Reinhold Häussermann (10 February 1884 – 4 April 1947) was a German-born Austrian stage and film actor. Haussermann appeared in twenty-one films during his career, largely in supporting roles in films such as Karl Leiter's The Missing Wife (1929). He was the father of the actor and director Ernst Haeussermann. His daughter in law was the actress Susi Nicoletti.

Selected filmography
 The Moon of Israel (1924)
 The Curse (1924)
 Ssanin (1924)
 The Third Squadron (1926)
 The Missing Wife (1929)
 The Prince of Arcadia (1932)
 A Star Fell from Heaven (1934)
 The Emperor's Candlesticks (1936)
  (1936)
 Konzert in Tirol (1938)
 A Mother's Love (1939)
 Anton the Last (1939)
 I Am Sebastian Ott (1939)
 Der Postmeister (1940)

References

Bibliography
 Youngkin, Stephen. The Lost One: A Life of Peter Lorre. University Press of Kentucky, 2005.

External links

1884 births
1947 deaths
Austrian male stage actors
Austrian male film actors
Austrian male silent film actors
German male stage actors
German male film actors
German male silent film actors
Male actors from Stuttgart
20th-century German male actors
20th-century Austrian male actors
Burials at Döbling Cemetery